Cessaire Perel Rivan (born 15 July 1981) is a Cameroonian boxer. Rivan competes in the light welterweight division (64 kg).

Rivan won a bronze medal at the 2003 All-Africa Games and competed in the 2006 Commonwealth Games.

Sources
 Biography at Melbourne 2006

1981 births
Living people
Welterweight boxers
Cameroonian male boxers
Boxers at the 2006 Commonwealth Games
Commonwealth Games competitors for Cameroon
African Games bronze medalists for Cameroon
African Games medalists in boxing
Competitors at the 2003 All-Africa Games
21st-century Cameroonian people